Walking with Strangers is the third studio album by Canadian rock band The Birthday Massacre. The album was released on September 10, 2007, in North America and September 21, 2007, in Europe.

The song "To Die For" is a reworked and re-recorded version of the track of the same name that appeared on the band's first album, Nothing & Nowhere, in 2002. "Remember Me" is also a reworked and re-recorded version of the track of the same name that appeared on the band's limited edition demo 1 Imagica.

Track listing

Singles
The first single, Red Stars, was released as a digital download on iTunes on August 21, 2007.
An EP for the song Looking Glass was released on May 6, 2008.

Credits and personnel
The Birthday Massacre
Chibi - lead vocals
Rainbow - rhythm guitar, synth/percussion programming, backing vocals
Mike Falcore - lead guitar, synth/percussion programming
O.E. - live bass, backing vocals
O-EN - live keyboards
Rhim - live drums

Reviews
 Stylus Magazine (B-) link
 AbsolutePunk (93%) link
 Release Magazine (8/10) link

Charts
On the issue date of September 29, 2007, Walking with Strangers debuted at number #10 on the Billboard Top Heatseekers chart. It stayed on the chart for two weeks.

Release history

Notes
"Weekend" features elements from "Sunday Bloody Sunday" by U2.
The track "Red Stars" is the album's first single and was released as an iTunes digital download. "Looking Glass", the second single off the album, received a physical release and a music video.
To promote the CD, the band went on two tours. The first being the "Walking with Strangers Tour" in 2007. For 2008 the band co-toured with Mindless Self Indulgence on their "If" tour.
A demo version of "Kill the Lights" was released on January 1, 2007. The band also played this demo version on their Broken Minds Tour in both North America and Europe in 2006.

References

External links
 , the band's official website

2007 albums
The Birthday Massacre albums
Metropolis Records albums